Awaran is a city in Balochistan, Pakistan.

Awaran may also refer to:
Awaran Tehsil, a tehsil of district Awaran.
Awaran District, an administrative unit of Balochistan, Pakistan

See also

 Avaran (disambiguation)
 Awara, Fukui, a human settlement in Japan.